Very Important Party (VIP) is an annual demo party held from 1999 to 2002 in Saint-Priest, near Lyon (France) and from 2008 in Thoissey. It is organized by PoPsY TeAm, a French demogroup from Lyon area.

It gathered hundreds of demosceners from various European countries, but mainly from France.

PoPsY TeAm created two demos to advertise the parties, VIP (1999) and VIP2 (2000). The VIP2 demo is certainly their most known production.

PoPsY TeAm

PoPsY TeAm is a French demogroup founded in Lyon (France) during July 1996. They have released demos on Atari (ST, Falcon) and PC.

This demogroup has organized the VIP demo party for four years, between 1999 and 2002 and since 2008.
Moreover, they have organized many bus trips to help demosceners from Lyon area to move to various European demo parties.
Many PoPsY TeAm members got involved in the video games industry.

Members
 ßouß - coder
 G-Hell - coder, musician
 Ly$
 mOMo - coder
 Toms
 TuO - coder (died February 2007)
 U2 - coder, 3D artist
 Taggy - graphician
  - coder
 titeiko - graphician
 ours - graphician

Releases
 Popsy Style (December 2012 Demo)
 Lack of Disco (2009 Nintendo DS Demo)
 VIP2 (June 2000 Demo)
 Nothing New (August 1999 Demo)
 VIP (April 1999 Demo)
 Mind's evolution (February 1999 Demo)
 Gloup (August 1998 Demo)
 Win00 (August 1998 Demo)
 ReactionnnA (March 1998 Demo)
 Hypnot-X (February 1998 Demo)
 Sanitarium (October 1997 Intro)
 IFS intro (February 1997 Intro)

VIP2 (demo)
The VIP2 is a Windows PC demo produced by PoPsY TeAm demogroup in June 2000, during the TakeOver (demoparty in the Netherlands) where it ranked first in the demos competition. It was created to advertise for the VIP2 demo party organized by PoPsY TeAm in July 2000. It was later shown during GDC 2001.

In January 2003, the VIP2 source code was released by its authors, which allowed Sesse to port it under Linux.

This demo makes use of a part of a Fear Factory song called Resurrection (Obsolete album 1998). It was the first demo from this demogroup to take advantage of 3D accelerated cards. There's a hidden part in it that can be activated through the launcher.

Technical information
 Size: 7,4 megabytes
 Running time: 3:17
 Platform: Win32, later ported to Linux
 Minimum requirements: Pentium II class CPU, TNT2 class video card

Screenshots

Credits
 G-Hell : Code and 2D
 Madman : 3D
 U2 : Main code and 3D
 TuO (now deceased): Code

External links
 Very Important Party on Pouët
 http://www.popsyteam.org/
 VIP2 demo, by PoPsY TeAm, on Pouët
 VIP2 demo on Scene.org
 VIP2 demo Linux version, by Sesse
 Interview of PoPsY TeAm, by Adok/Hugi - 04 Aug 2000

Demo parties
Recurring events established in 1999